Hector Halsall (20 August 1900 – October 1966) was an English professional rugby league footballer who played in the 1920s and 1930s, and coached in the 1930 and 1940s.

Background
Halsall was born in Wigan, Lancashire, England, after retiring from playing, he worked as a trainer at Barrow for 18 years, he died aged 66 in Wigan Infirmary, Wigan.

Playing career

Swinton
Halsall made his début for Swinton on 6 November 1920.

County Cup Final appearances
Halsall played right-, i.e. number 3, and was captain in Swinton's 0–17 defeat by St Helens Recs in the 1923 Lancashire County Cup Final during the 1923–24 season at Central Park, Wigan on 24 November 1923, played right-, i.e. number 3, and was captain in the 15–11 victory over Wigan in the 1925 Lancashire County Cup Final during the 1925–26 season at The Cliff, Broughton, Salford on 9 December 1925 (postponed from Saturday 21 November 1925 due to fog), and played right-, i.e. number 3, and was captain in the 5–2 victory over Wigan in the 1927 Lancashire County Cup Final during the 1927–28 season at Watersheddings, Oldham on 19 November 1927.

Club honours
Halsall was captain of Swinton's 1927–28 Northern Rugby Football League season All Four Cups team.

International honours
Halsall won a cap for Great Britain while at Swinton in 1930 against Australia.

References

External links
(archived by web.archive.org) Great Britain Statistics at englandrl.co.uk (statistics currently missing due to not having appeared for both Great Britain, and England)
Search for "Hector Halsall" at britishnewspaperarchive.co.uk

1900 births
1966 deaths
Barrow Raiders coaches
Date of death missing
English rugby league coaches
English rugby league players
Great Britain national rugby league team players
Rugby league centres
Rugby league players from Wigan
Swinton Lions captains
Swinton Lions players